On the Cool Side is a smooth jazz album by keyboardist and jazz vocalist Ben Sidran. Released in 1985, it was Sidran's fourteenth studio album.

Background

On the Cool Side was one of Sidran's first commercially successful solo releases, receiving significant airtime on contemporary jazz stations at the time. It was also his first album to use electronic instruments, including drum machines and a Yamaha DX7 synthesiser "to capture the spirit of the times".

Some album releases were pressed on translucent black vinyl.

Track listing

Personnel
 Billy Petersonbass (on "Lover Man Part 1" and "Lover Man Part 2")
 Howard Arthurguitar (on "Mitsubishi Boy" and "Brown Eyes")
 Paul Petersonsynthesizer (on "Lover Man Part 1" and "Lover Man Part 2")
 Ricky Petersonsynthesizer, keyboards, backing vocals (on "Brown Eyes")
 Mac Rebennackbacking vocals (on "Up a Lazy River")
 Steve Millerbacking vocals (on "On the Cool Side")
 Patty Petersonbacking vocals (on "Heat Wave")
 Ben Sidransynthesizer, keyboards, vocals

Reception

Writing for AllMusic, Jim Newsom commented the "music on this recording is heavily electronicized [..] but it sure sounds like a lot of fun." He summarised the eponymous track as "a classic of the genre, an upbeat, joyous affirmation of life, featuring a backing vocal from old pal Steve Miller [..] you'll find yourself walking down the street singing "keep on searching, keep it on the cool side" with a big smile on your face."

Newsom also praised the renditions of "Lover Man", "Heat Wave" and "Up a Lazy River" with Sidran's new "funky" elements.

References

Bibliography

External links
Album on Amazon
Album on Apple iTunes
Album on CDUniverse

Ben Sidran albums
1985 albums